Bulimba may refer to:
 Bulimba, Queensland, a suburb of Brisbane in Australia
 Bulimba Reach, a reach of the Brisbane River
 Bulimba House, a heritage-listed house in Bulimba, Queensland
 Electoral district of Bulimba, an electorate in the Queensland Legislative Assembly
 Bulimba Division, a former local government area in Queensland
 Bulimba ferry wharf, a ferry terminal in Bulimba
 Bulimba Cross River Ferry
 Bulimba Cemetery, a cemetery near Bulimba
 Bulimba, a former name for the suburb of Teneriffe, Queensland in Brisbane
 Bulimba Branch railway line, a former Queensland railway line to Teneriffe (formerly known as Bulimba)
 Bulimba Beer brewed in Teneriffe, Queensland (formerly Bulimba)
 Bulimba Creek, a tributary of the Brisbane River
 Bulimba Cup, a football competition in Queensland